The Government of Ireland Act 1920 (10 & 11 Geo. 5 c. 67) was an Act of the Parliament of the United Kingdom. The Act's long title was "An Act to provide for the better government of Ireland"; it is also known as the Fourth Home Rule Bill or (inaccurately) as the Fourth Home Rule Act. The Act was intended to partition Ireland into two self-governing polities: the six north-eastern counties were to form "Northern Ireland", while the larger part of the country was to form "Southern Ireland". Both territories were to remain part of the United Kingdom of Great Britain and Ireland, and provision was made for their future reunification through a Council of Ireland. The Act was passed by the British Parliament in November 1920, received royal assent in December, and came into force on 3 May 1921.

The smaller Northern Ireland was duly created with a devolved government and remained in the UK. The larger Southern Ireland was not recognized by most of its citizens, who instead recognized the self-declared Irish Republic in the ongoing Irish War of Independence. The conflict resulted in the Anglo-Irish Treaty in December 1921. Under the treaty, Ireland would leave the UK (with the option for Northern Ireland to opt out and remain in the UK, which it immediately did) in December 1922 and become the Irish Free State, which would later evolve into today's Republic of Ireland. The institutions set up under this Act for Northern Ireland continued to function until they were suspended by the British parliament in 1972 as a consequence of the Troubles.

The remaining provisions of the Act still in force in Northern Ireland were repealed under the terms of the 1998 Good Friday Agreement.

Background 

Various attempts had been made to give Ireland limited regional self-government, known as Home rule, in the late 19th and early 20th centuries.

The First Home Rule Bill of 1886 was defeated in the House of Commons because of a split in the Liberal Party over the principle of Home Rule, while the Second Home Rule Bill of 1893, having been passed by the Commons was vetoed by the House of Lords. The Third Home Rule Bill introduced in 1912 by the Irish Parliamentary Party could no longer be vetoed after the passing of the Parliament Act 1911 which removed the power of the Lords to veto bills. They could merely be delayed for two years.

Because of the continuing threat of civil war in Ireland, King George V called the Buckingham Palace Conference in July 1914 where Irish Nationalist and Unionist leaders failed to reach agreement. Controversy continued over the rival demands of Irish Nationalists, backed by the Liberals (for all-Ireland home rule), and Irish Unionists, backed by the Conservatives, for the exclusion of most or all of the province of Ulster. In an attempt at compromise, the British government put forward an amending bill, which would have allowed for Ulster to be temporarily excluded from the working of the Act; this failed to satisfy either side, and the stalemate continued until overtaken by the outbreak of World War I. A few weeks after the British entry into the war, the Act received Royal Assent, while the amending bill was abandoned. However, the Suspensory Act 1914 (which received Royal Assent on the same day) meant that implementation would be suspended for the duration of what was expected to be only a short European war.

Developments in Ireland 
During the Great War, Irish politics moved decisively in a different direction. Several events, including the Easter Rising of 1916, the subsequent reaction of the British Government, and the Conscription Crisis of 1918, had altered the state of Irish politics, and contributed to Sinn Féin becoming the dominant voice of Irish nationalism. Sinn Féin, standing for 'an independent sovereign Ireland', won 73 of the 105 parliamentary seats on the island in the 1918 general election. Its elected members established their own parliament, Dáil Éireann, which declared the country's independence as the Irish Republic. Dáil Éireann, after a number of meetings, was declared illegal in September 1919 by the Lord Lieutenant of Ireland, Viscount French.

When the Act became law on 23 December 1920 it was already out of touch with realities in Ireland. The long-standing demand for home rule had been replaced among nationalists by a demand for complete independence (an Irish Republic). The Republic's army was waging the Irish War of Independence against British rule, which had reached a nadir in late 1920.

Long's committee

A delay ensued because of the effective end of the First World War in November 1918, the Paris Peace Conference, 1919, and the Treaty of Versailles that was signed in June 1919. Starting in September 1919, with the British Government, now led by David Lloyd George, committed under all circumstances to implementing Home Rule, the British cabinet's Committee for Ireland, under the chairmanship of former Ulster Unionist Party leader Walter Long, pushed for a radical new solution. Long proposed the creation of two Irish home rule entities, Northern Ireland and Southern Ireland, each with unicameral parliaments. The House of Lords accordingly amended the old Bill to create a new Bill which provided for two bicameral parliaments, "consisting of His Majesty, the Senate of (Northern or Southern) Ireland, and the House of Commons of (Northern or Southern) Ireland."

The Bill's second reading debates in late March 1920 revealed that already a large number of Irish members of parliament present felt that the proposals were unworkable.

For a variety of reasons all the Ulster Unionist MPs at Westminster voted against the Act. They preferred that all or most of Ulster would remain fully within the United Kingdom, accepting the proposed northern Home Rule state only as the second best option. The Long Committee originally called for all nine Counties of Ulster to be included in Northern Ireland. When it became clear that three counties of Ulster would be excluded from Northern Ireland, southern Unionists left the Irish Unionist Alliance (dissolved in 1922) and formed the Unionist Anti-Partition League in opposition to the impending partition of Ireland.

After considerable delays in debating the financial aspects of the measure, the substantive third reading of the Bill was approved by a large majority on 11 November 1920. A considerable number of the Irish Members present voted against the Bill, including Southern Unionists such as Maurice Dockrell, and Nationalists like Joe Devlin. Most Irish MPs were abstaining from Westminster, sitting in Dáil Éireann.

Two 'Home Rule' Irelands 
The Act divided Ireland into two territories, Southern Ireland and Northern Ireland, each intended to be self-governing, except in areas specifically reserved to the Parliament of the United Kingdom: chief amongst these were matters relating to the Crown, to defence, foreign affairs, international trade, and currency. During a speech at Caernarvon (in October 1920) Lloyd George stated his reasoning for reserving specific governmental functions: "The Irish temper is an uncertainty and dangerous forces like armies and navies are better under the control of the Imperial Parliament."

Northern Ireland was defined as "the parliamentary counties of Antrim, Armagh, Down, Fermanagh, Londonderry and Tyrone, and the parliamentary boroughs of Belfast and Londonderry", and Southern Ireland was defined as "so much of Ireland as is not comprised within the said parliamentary counties and boroughs". Northern Ireland, amounting to six of the nine counties of Ulster, was seen as the maximum area within which Unionists could be expected to have a safe majority. This was in spite of the fact that in the last all Ireland election (1918 Irish general election) counties Fermanagh and Tyrone had Sinn Fein/Nationalist Party (Irish Parliamentary Party) majorities.

Structures of the governmental system 
At the apex of the governmental system was to be the Lord Lieutenant of Ireland, who would be the Monarch's representative in both of the Irish home rule regions. The system was based on colonial constitutional theories. Executive authority was to be vested in the crown, and in theory not answerable to either parliament. The Lord Lieutenant would appoint a cabinet that did not need parliamentary support. No provision existed for a prime minister.

Such structures matched the theory in the British dominions, such as Canada and Australia, where in powers belonged to the governor-general and there was no normal responsibility to parliament. In reality, governments had long come to be chosen from parliament and to be answerable to it. Prime ministerial offices had come into  existence. Such developments were also expected to happen in Northern Ireland and Southern Ireland, but technically were not required under the Act.

Constituency reform 

The Act revised the constituencies in the Redistribution of Seats (Ireland) Act 1918 for elections to the Parliament of the United Kingdom. In place of the 105 UK MPs for all of Ireland in 1918, there were to be 33 UK MPs from Southern Ireland and 13 UK MPs from Northern Ireland. The same constituencies were to elect 128 MPs to the Southern Ireland House of Commons and 52 MPs to the Northern Ireland House of Commons. Elections for the two Irish parliaments took place in May 1921. No elections were held in Southern Ireland to the United Kingdom House of Commons as the Irish Free State was due to be established on 6 December 1922, less than a month after the 1922 United Kingdom general election.

Potential for Irish unity 
As well as sharing the same viceroy, a Council of Ireland was to be composed of 20 members from each Parliament. The Council would co-ordinate matters of common concern to the two parliaments (transport, health, agriculture etc). Each Parliament was to possess the ability, in identical motions, to vote powers to the Council, which Britain intended should evolve into a single Irish Parliament.

Aftermath

Northern Ireland 
The Parliament of Northern Ireland came into being in June 1921. At its inauguration, in Belfast City Hall, King George V made a famous appeal for Anglo-Irish and north–south reconciliation. The speech, drafted by the government of David Lloyd George on recommendations from Jan Smuts Prime Minister of the Union of South Africa, with the enthusiastic backing of the King, opened the door for formal contact between the British Government and the Republican administration of Éamon de Valera.

Though it was superseded in large part, its repeal remained a matter of controversy until accomplished in the 1990s (under the provisions of the 1998 Good Friday Agreement).

Southern Ireland 
All 128 MPs elected to the House of Commons of Southern Ireland in the May 1921 elections were returned unopposed, and 124 of them, representing Sinn Féin, declared themselves TDs (Teachtaí Dála, Irish for Dáil Deputies) and assembled as the Second Dáil of the Irish Republic.

With only the four Independent Unionist MPs, who had been elected for the Dublin University constituency and fifteen appointed senators turning up for the state opening of the Parliament of Southern Ireland at the Royal College of Science in Dublin (now Government Buildings) in June 1921, the new legislature was suspended. Southern Ireland was ruled, for the time being, directly from London as it had been before the Government of Ireland Act.

The Provisional Government of the Irish Free State was constituted on 14 January 1922 "at a meeting of members of the Parliament elected for constituencies in Southern Ireland". That meeting was not convened as a meeting of the House of Commons of Southern Ireland nor as a meeting of the Dáil. Instead, it was convened by Arthur Griffith as "Chairman of the Irish Delegation of Plenipotentiaries" (who had signed the Anglo-Irish Treaty) under the terms of the Treaty.

Elections in June 1922 were followed by the meeting of the Third Dáil, which worked as a Constituent Assembly to draft a constitution for the Irish Free State. For the purposes of British law the constitution was confirmed by the Irish Free State Constitution Act 1922; the new state then came into being on 6 December 1922.

Consequences 
The Treaty provided for the ability of Northern Ireland's Parliament, by formal address, to opt out of the new Irish Free State, which as expected, the Parliament of Northern Ireland brought into effect on 7 December 1922 (the day after the establishment of the Irish Free State). An Irish Boundary Commission was set up to redraw the border between the new Irish Free State and Northern Ireland, but it remained unchanged in return for financial concessions, and the British and Irish governments agreed to suppress its report. The Council of Ireland never functioned as hoped (as an embryonic all-Ireland parliament), as the new governments decided to find a better mechanism in January 1922.

In consequence of the establishment of the Irish Free State, the British parliament passed the Irish Free State (Consequential Provisions) Act 1922, which made a number of adjustments to Northern Ireland's system of government as set up by the 1920 Act. Most notably, the office of Lord Lieutenant was abolished, being replaced by the new office of Governor of Northern Ireland.

Repeal 
The final provisions of the 1920 Act remaining in force in the United Kingdom were repealed under the terms of the Northern Ireland Act 1998, after the Good Friday Agreement. In the republic, the Statute Law Revision Act 2007 repealed the Act almost 85 years after Constitution of the Irish Free State replaced it as the basic constitutional law.

Footnotes

References

Sources 
Primary
 
 
 
 

Secondary

External links 
 Government of Ireland Act 1920 (repealed 2.12.1999), links to original and 1990s versions and related legislation, from legislation.gov.uk
 HL/PO/PU/1/1920/10&11G5c67  digitization of first and last pages of the House of Lords copy of the act in the Parliamentary Archives
 Government of Ireland Act 1920, full original text from BAILII
 "Government of Ireland Act 1920", matches in debates Hansard 1803–2005

Home rule in Ireland
Southern Ireland (1921–22)
British constitutional laws concerning Ireland
Constitutional laws of Northern Ireland
Unionism in Ireland
1920 in Ireland
1998 disestablishments in Ireland
United Kingdom Acts of Parliament 1920
Repealed United Kingdom Acts of Parliament
Acts of the Parliament of the United Kingdom concerning Ireland
Acts of the Parliament of the United Kingdom concerning Northern Ireland